WUVI-LD, VHF channel 3, is a low-power television station licensed to Chicago, Illinois.

External links
 

UVI-LD
Low-power television stations in the United States
Television channels and stations established in 2007
2007 establishments in Indiana